The first season of New Zealand reality television series The Block NZ premiered on 4 July 2012, and ended on 6 September 2012. The season was judged by Victoria Bidwell and Stewart Harris.

Sibling team Libby and Ben Crawford won the season, selling their house for a profit of $157,000 and winning the $80,000 prize money. Dating couple Sarah Adams and Richard Boobyer came second, selling their house for a $64,000 profit, teenage sweethearts Ginny Death and Rhys Wineera sold their house for a profit of $11,000, while engaged couple Rachel Rasch and Tyson Hill sold their house for the reserve price.

Contestants

Episodes

Score history

Winners & Losers

Challenges

Auction

References

2012 New Zealand television seasons